Ahmad II ibn Muhammad was Emir of Harar (1794–1821), and grandnephew of Emir Ahmad I ibn Abi Bakr. He made several successful military expeditions against the Oromo around the city of Harar, which probably helped to keep the trade routes open west to Shewa and east to Zeila. On his death in 1821, his brothers `Abd ar-Rahman ibn Muhammad and `Abd al-Karim ibn Muhammad fought over the succession.

See also
List of emirs of Harar
Harar

Notes 

1821 deaths
Emirs of Harar
Year of birth unknown